Below are the squads for the 2002 AFF Championship, co-hosted by Indonesia and Singapore, which took place between 15 and 29 December 2002. The players' listed age is their age on the tournament's opening day (15 December 2002).

Group A

Vietnam
Head coach:  Henrique Calisto

Indonesia
Head coach:  Ivan Venkov Kolev

Myanmar
Head coach:  David Booth

Cambodia
Head coach:  Joachim Fickert

Philippines
Head coach:  Sugao Kambe

Group B

Malaysia
Head coach:  Allan Harris

Thailand
Head coach:  Peter Withe

Singapore
Head coach:  Jan Poulsen

Laos
Head coach: Soutsakhone Oudomphet

External links 
 2002 Tiger Cup - squads at RSSSF

AFF Championship squads
squads